C. J. Wilson (born November 18, 1989) is a former American football cornerback who played for the Tampa Bay Buccaneers in the National Football League (NFL). He was signed by the Chicago Bears as an undrafted free agent in 2013. He played college football at NC State.

He was also a member of the Tampa Bay Buccaneers.

Professional career

Chicago Bears
On April 28, 2013, Wilson signed with the Chicago Bears as an undrafted free agent. He was waived on October 28, but was brought back onto the practice squad.

Tampa Bay Buccaneers
Wilson lost two fingers in a fireworks accident on July 4, 2015. On July 24, 2015, Wilson announced he was retiring from the NFL due to his injuries.

References

External links
Tampa Bay Buccaneers bio
NC State Wolfpack football bio
Chicago Bears bio

1989 births
Living people
American football cornerbacks
Chicago Bears players
NC State Wolfpack football players
People from Lincolnton, North Carolina
Players of American football from North Carolina
Tampa Bay Buccaneers players